Nayar or Nayyar may refer to:

Groups of people
 Nair, a group of Hindu castes from the Southern Indian state of Kerala
 Velakkathala Nayar, a caste found in Kerala state, India
 A clan within the Khatri
 Nayar (name), including Nayyar

Other
 El Nayar, a Mexican municipality

See also
 
 Nair (disambiguation)
 Nayer